Crystal Castles is the debut studio album by Canadian electronic music duo Crystal Castles; at the time of its release, the group consisted of producer Ethan Kath and singer Alice Glass. The two met each other in 2004 and both had an interest in noise acts like AIDS Wolf & The Sick Lipstick. This inspired the two to start a project that made noise music, but instead of guitars, they would use electronic sounds made with a circuit-bent Atari 5200–which effectively led to the media pigeonholing the act as chiptune, despite the fact that the members themselves didn't deliberately intend this.

Despite being labeled as the group's debut album, Crystal Castles is a compilation of sold-out singles that popularized the duo internationally, as well as unreleased demos recorded in 2004 along with three new cuts: "Untrust Us, "Courtship Dating," and "Tell Me What to Swallow." The content on the LP includes samples of tracks from acts such as Death from Above 1979, Grandmaster Flash and the Furious Five, Luciano Berio, Drinking Electricity, and Van She. Some professional music journalists highlighted its random and unpredictable nature as well as its unique style and sound.

Crystal Castles was released on March 18, 2008, by Lies Records and Last Gang Records, and sold well enough in the United States to make its way onto Billboard such as Independent Albums, Top Dance/Electronic Albums, and Top Heatseekers. It also charted in Australia, France, Ireland, Scotland and the United Kingdom. Many professional critics had complimentary opinions towards the album, one writer for Delusions of Adequacy calling it "one of the best electronic albums of the year." The record ranked in the top 20 on numerous year-end lists by publications such as Pitchfork, NME, and PopMatters and landed on lists of the best albums of the 2000s by NME and Complex. In 2013, Crystal Castles was number 477 on NME's list of "The 500 Greatest Albums of All Time."

Background and release
Ethan Kath and Alice Glass first met each other in the summer of 2004 while doing community service at the center for the blind. They were both into noise music and formed Crystal Castles to produce a new style of noise that didn't involve using guitars but rather dance music elements and electronic keyboards. Kath gave Glass a CD of twenty-five instrumentals, and Glass chose to record vocals for five of them. Crystal Castles includes some of these demo recordings that were previously unreleased. In 2005, United Kingdom label Merok Records discovered Crystal Castles via a mic check recording titled "Alice Practice" that was uploaded to MySpace in 2005 and released an extended play of the same name by the duo in 2006. Following a set of sold-out 7-inches releases on other UK labels, Crystal Castles became popular to an international level.

The Montreal-based Last Gang Records issued Crystal Castles' self-titled first studio album in North America and the United Kingdom in March 2008. In order to prevent online leaking of the record, Last Gang did not issue any previews of it. However, an article published in Now in February 2008 reported of a fake version of the LP published around several file-sharing sites and garnering numerous downloads. This version was a set of demos recorded in 2004, while the actual LP consisted of content recorded from 2005 to 2007. As Kath explained, "I originally gave Alice [Glass] a CD of 24 songs to choose from back when we first started, and some kid took 16 of them and put them up on the Internet as the album, and people have been reviewing it. I've actually read some very positive reviews for the 2004 demos."

Production and composition

Kath described their musical style as "AIDS Wolf get into a fight with New Order." In making their music, the duo mainly focused on how "abrasive" noise music was; as Glass explained, "annoying people still evokes an emotion in them. When you hear a bunch of crazy sounds you're gonna feel something." In analyzing how this relates the music that appears on their self-titled debut album, Edgar Smith of Time Out London wrote that the meaning of the tracks come from their "splintered melod[ies] and melancholic drum-loops" and not from their incomprehensible vocals and lyrics. In order for the music to have elements of being "annoying," Kath explained that he created many of the sounds on tracks that would appear on Crystal Castles by sampling textures produced from a circuit-bent Atari 5200 console. Fawn used these sounds because they were "annoying." The use of these sounds led multiple journalists and bloggers to categorized the works of Crystal Castles under an 8-bit chiptune genre that the duo did not intend to be classified as; this categorization was further affected by the coincidence of an early 1980s arcade game by Atari named Crystal Castles (1983).

The 8-bit sounds are played over harsh, industrial music-style drums. Ian Cohen, a contributor for Pitchfork, analyzed that while the content on Crystal Castles goes through multiple genres and types of structures, "the body of the album can be distilled to an essence of the glassy, ten-lane stare of Last Exit with Ed Banger's egg-frying EQ." A writer for Prefix magazine categorized it as a mix of mid-tempo melodic electronic dance cuts and dark, noisy, and less accessible electro-punk. Writing for Resident Advisor, Stéphane Girard compared the DIY aspect of the album to the works of Scottish group Bis and American band Adult, while one writer for Entertainment Weekly compared the album's sound to English electronic band Ladytron.

However, there were also reviewers that highlighted Crystal Castles's style and sound as unique in comparison to most other electronic dance acts. Mehan Jayasuriya, writing for PopMatters, called it the "most iconoclastic and the most convincing" record of 2008's electro dance scene, reasoning that "their stripped-down, yet grimy aesthetic spits in the face of maximalist electro, offering a counterpoint to the polished, melodically overstated sound of Daft Punk and their progeny." Tiny Mix Tapes writer Cor Limey labeled the LP as "independent" from similar nostalgia-driven indie electronic music because of its elements of irony and self-awareness. He wrote that it "smash[es] all allusions to the Atari/cartoon generation of the '80s into their minute molecular parts and then piec[es] their electrum fragments into a bigger, newer, musical battlecat." A Drowned in Sound critic went as so far as to call the music "otherworldly" and "almost new-worldly" and compared it to the works of My Bloody Valentine, The Velvet Underground, and Sonic Youth in that the band "strike out to the edges of their own sensibility and return with the most unwieldy, uncomfortable sounds they find there before trying to work that noise inwards 'til it passes for pop."

Throughout Crystal Castles, all elements of the music's structure constantly changes in moments unforeseeable by the listener; this includes the amount of chaos, noise, melodic elements, energy, and atmosphere in the tracks, with one critic from URB labeling the instrumentals as a "mix of tragedy and uppity beat munching." Cohen noted that this unpredictable aspect was especially true in the LP's last two tracks: "the mad dash of "Black Panther" is probably what nu-rave was supposed to sound like (the Goth! Team?), and then the record ends on a disquietingly beautiful shoegaze comedown played on an acoustic guitar of all things ("Tell Me What to Swallow")." Despite this, however, Girard analyzed the album still "sounds immensely coherent, even when it is not at all."

The random element of Crystal Castles also applies to Glass's vocal performances where, in the words of AllMusic journalist Heather Phares, it can be "terrifying on one track and kittenish on another." Ginger King of Consequence of Sound compared Glass to Karen O, Jemina Pearl, or Glass Candy singer Ida No but also wrote that "the difference is Alice Glass somehow gives less of a fuck." Limey described Glass's vocal performance as "violent," "sometimes morose," and other times "lilting like a Valley girl," while Spin magazine's Mosi Reeves labeled it as "sarcastic." The vocals are heavily altered digitally, and Prefix noted them to have a "fragility" unusual in most electronic dance music.

Content
Crystal Castles is a compilation of the band's previous sold-out singles, early unreleased tracks and three new songs recorded for the album. New tracks on the LP include "Through the Hosiery," "Reckless," and the album's closing track "Tell Me What to Swallow," a ballad that consists of an acoustic guitar and 40 vocal layers sung by Glass.

The album's opener "Untrust Us" uses vocals from Death from Above 1979's "Dead Womb." The vocals are "disembodied and chopped up" and are performed over a "cyclical synth loop," wrote Pitchfork contributor Ian Cohen. The vocals are edited in a way that "could very well be confused for gibberish or Japanese," analyzed King. The electroclash-style "Courtship Dating" includes Three 6 Mafia-esque percussion click sounds, what Cohen described as "fizzy synths" and a "call-and-response chant." Phares described Glass' singing on the track as like a "spaced-out valley girl."

"Alice Practice" was claimed to be a mic check recording that Merok chose as Crystal Castle's first single. Journalist John Brainlove categorized it as a "hit and run electropop" cut that includes "flailing, pulsing beeps smashed over an evil beat and driven onward by an incomprehensible shrieked vocal." Cohen labeled "Good Time" a "veritable toybox with undulating octaves, an almost Eastern-sounding riff and tweaked nice-guy vocals which combine the Knife and New Order." As Phares wrote, "Xxzxcuzx Me" depicts Glass sounding like an android with her voice "degrad[ing] into pixels almost as soon as she opens her mouth." Analogized by King as a shorter but harsher version of "Alice Practice," "Crimewave," another electroclash-infused track, is a collaboration with American noise group HEALTH that includes a set of rattling drum sounds. "Magic Spells" starts with a set of incoherent sounds that, in the words of King, "gently transition into James Murphy style smoothness." Distorted singing then comes in near the end of the song.

Critical reception

Bryan Sanchez of Delusions of Adequacy called it "one of the best electronic albums of the year," highlighting how it was "stylishly sequenced," where "change of paces happen and come in at just the right times." Some critics praised the LP's unpredictable nature. AllMusic journalist Heather Phares was one of them, describing the album as "fresher, more complex, and much less gimmicky than might be expected, especially for those familiar with only the band's singles" and a "familiar-sounding, edgy, innocent, menacing, bold, nuanced, and altogether striking debut." King wrote a five-star review of the album for Consequence of Sound and praised its "high energy" and "pure originality." Tony Naylor, in his eight-out-of-ten review for NME, noted feeling "intrigued and awestruck" after listening to the record and opined that "you will hear nothing better this year than" the tracks "Untrust Us," "Crimewave," "Air War," and "Vanished."

A critic for Prefix called Crystal Castles "an electro record that challenges, succeeding and failing all at once, and perhaps most important, never forgetting the primary goal of dance music." He stated that in spite of its random amounts of moods and genres, the listener can still "truly enter the artists' world," and the record "never feel[s] out of step or over the players' heads." A reviewer for Drowned in Sound stated that "what makes Crystal Castles so thrilling is that [the duo] turn the fruits of [the availability of technology] into weapons to use against it, using [it] to cut through the shitty mire." He praised it as "a crystal castle of technological rubbish fusing together under the harsh gaze of a falling sun, Kath and Glass digging around in the molten plastic for things to bang together, new-age Stigs dreaming of leisure's lost golden age in a data dump."

Crystal Castles also had a few mixed critical opinions. Some reviewers, including Naylor and Paul Nolan from Hot Press, felt that the more noise-induced, less pop-music-orientated cuts of the LP were its weakest tracks. Dorian Lynskey of The Guardian summarized that the record is "all manic with youthful enthusiasm but unsatisfyingly feels half-finished, as if Crystal Castles are still struggling to mould these wonderful sounds into something coherent." In a piece for The Skinny, Sean McNamara opined that most of the album's content was "static, ZX Spectrum computer style melodies and sheer noise-a-rama," which was disappointing given that songs like "Crimewave," "Magic Spells," and "1991" show "real evidence that when they calm down a bit they can produce some high quality electro that is a delight to hear."

In Dave Hughes' review of Crystal Castles for Slant Magazine, he noted three types of songs on the record that he marked as "Wii," "Xbox," and "Huffing Paint Thinner." "Wii" tracks, which include "1991" and "Black Panther," are "stupid, simplistic, and incredibly fun" and have "ping-ponging keyboard melodies and stray laser beam noises" foreground in the mix with vocals that work as "atmospheric background mumbles." "Xbox" songs, such as "Untrust Us" and "Magic Spells," are cuts with complex concepts, and Hughes opined that while these types of tracks were "accomplished," they didn't have a "killer app." "Huffing Paint Thinner" was labeled by Hughes as the worst type of track on the LP; he wrote that songs in this category such as "Alice Practice" "make one nostalgic for the soothing sounds of Atari Teenage Riot" and are "quite irritating and certainly not good for one's brain cells — even if you're the type who enjoys the ranty screams of lead singers who cannot, strictly, sing." He overall summarized that "where the rest of the album trades in cheap-sounding and eccentric but still rather charming variations on punky dance-pop, Crystal Castles’ most rockist moments seem to wish to appear arty by being as annoying as possible."

Commercial performance
As of April 2010, sales in the United States have exceeded 72,000 copies, according to Nielsen SoundScan. As of September 2014 it was certified Silver for 60,000 copies sold in the UK by British Phonographic Industry.

Accolades

Track listing

Notes
  signifies a vocal producer
  signifies a main and vocal producer

Sample credits
 "Untrust Us" contains a sample of "Dead Womb" by Death from Above 1979.
 "Magic Spells" contains a sample of "The Message" by Grandmaster Flash and the Furious Five.
 "Air War" contains a sample of "Thema (Omaggio a Joyce)" by Luciano Berio.
 "Good Time" contains a sample of "Good Times" (Dance Mix) by Drinking Electricity.
 "Vanished" contains a sample of the vocal track and melody of "Sex City" by Van She.

Personnel
Credits adapted from the liner notes of Crystal Castles.

Crystal Castles
 Crystal Castles – vocal production 
 Ethan Kath – production ; mixing ; vocal production 
 Alice Glass – vocals

Additional personnel

 Health – backing screams 
 Alex Bonenfant – additional vocal recording ; mixing ; recording 
 Matthew Wagner – vocal recording ; vocal production 
 Squeak E. Clean – vocal production 
 Lexxx – mixing 
 Lazar Nesic – mixing 
 Nils – mastering
 Stuart Pillinger – cover photo
 Mikey Apples – layout

Charts

Weekly charts

Year-end charts

References

2008 debut albums
Crystal Castles (band) albums
Last Gang Records albums